Seoige is an Irish surname that may refer to
Gráinne Seoige (born 1973), Irish journalist and news anchor 
Marcus Seoige (born 1976), Irish actor
Síle Seoige (born 1979), Irish television presenter

Irish-language surnames